Fowlstown is an unincorporated community in Decatur County, Georgia, United States. Fowlstown has a post office with ZIP code 39852, which opened on March 12, 1883. An early variant name was Kemp.

See also
 Battle of Fowltown

References

Unincorporated communities in Decatur County, Georgia
Unincorporated communities in Georgia (U.S. state)